Joachim Król  (born 17 June 1957 in Herne, West Germany) is a German actor, known for his appearances in the films Run Lola Run, Maybe, Maybe Not, and Anne Frank: The Whole Story.

Early life and education
Król was born in Herne, West Germany and studied from 1981 to 1984 at the Otto-Falckenberg-Schule in Munich. His father was a miner of Polish descent.

Career

Król is best known as a film and television actor. In 1993, he starred in the film No More Mr. Nice Guy. In the 1998 film, Run Lola Run, Król portrayed the homeless man, Norbert von Au. He is also known for playing Hermann van Pels in the TV film Anne Frank: The Whole Story (2001). Despite his notable cinema and television success, Król returns repeatedly to the stage. Several times he has played in the Bochumer Schauspielhaus and the Schauspielhaus Köln.

Personal life
Król is married to Heidrun Teusner Król, with whom he has a son, Tom.

Selected filmography
 (1988) as Eduard
No More Mr. Nice Guy (1993) as Rudi Kipp
Deadly Maria (1993) as Dieter
Maybe, Maybe Not (1994) as Norbert Brommer
Nobody Loves Me (1994) as Anton
The Superwife (1996) as Dr. Enno Winkel
It Happened in Broad Daylight (1997) as Kommissar Matthäus
When the Light Comes (1998) as Lars
Trains'n'Roses (1998) as Hannes
Run Lola Run (1998) as Norbert von Au
Die Unschuld der Krähen (1998, TV film) as Georg Finke
Gloomy Sunday (1999) as Laszlo
The Princess and the Warrior (2000)
Donna Leon (2000–2003, TV series), Episodes 1, 2, 3 & 4 of the Commissario Brunetti Series as Commissario Brunetti.
Anne Frank: The Whole Story (2001, TV film)
Soundless (2004)
Silentium (2004)
The Three Robbers (2007) as Räuber (voice)
Adam Resurrected (2008)
Friends Forever (2009) as Waldemer (voice)
Henri 4 (2010) as Théodore-Agrippa d'Aubigné
 (2011) as Muff Potter
Tatort (2011–2015, TV series), 7 episodes as Kommissar Frank Steier
 (2012) as Matthias Bleuel
 (2016, TV film) as Christoph Dassler
 (2017, TV film) as Herbert Wichert
 (2018)
Berlin Alexanderplatz (2020)
The Postcard Killings (2020)
 (2021)

Awards
1994: Won: Bavarian Film Awards, Best Actor 
2007: Won: Hessian Film Award, Best Actor, (for Windland)

References

External links

1957 births
Living people
People from Herne, North Rhine-Westphalia
German male television actors
German male film actors
20th-century German male actors
21st-century German male actors
German people of Polish descent
German Film Award winners